Commersonia grandiflora is a species of flowering plant in the family Malvaceae and is endemic to the south of Western Australia. It is an erect, open shrub with hairy, egg-shaped to elliptic leaves, and white or cream-coloured flowers.

Description
The edges of the leaves are serrated and rolled under, both surfaces densely covered with star-shaped hairs. The flowers have five white or cream-coloured, hairy, petal-like sepals and five hairy white petals with a hairy, narrow ligule about the same length as the sepals. There is a single white staminode between each pair of stamens. Flowering occurs from July to November and the fruit is a spherical capsule  in diameter and densely-covered with white, star-shaped hairs and bristles.

Taxonomy
This species was first described in 1837 by Stephan Endlicher who gave it the name Rulingia grandiflora in Enumeratio plantarum quas in Novae Hollandiae ora austro-occidentali ad fluvium Cygnorum et in sinu Regis Georgii collegit Carolus Liber Baro de Hügel from specimens collected from King George Sound.  In 2011, Carolyn Wilkins and Barbara Whitlock transferred the species to the genus Commersonia as C. grandiflora in the journal Australian Systematic Botany.

The specific epithet (grandiflorum) means "large-flowered".

Distribution and habitat
This commersonia grows in sheltered woodland and mallee heath mainly between Walpole and the Fitzgerald River National Park, but also near Esperance, in the Esperance Plains, Jarrah Forest, and Warren bioregions of southern Western Australia.<ref name=FB>{{FloraBase|name=Commersonia grandiflora|id=40920}}</ref>

Conservation statusCommersonia grandiflora'' is listed as "not threatened" by the Government of Western Australia Department of Biodiversity, Conservation and Attractions.

References 

 grandiflora
Endemic flora of Western Australia
Rosids of Western Australia
Plants described in 1837
Taxa named by Stephan Endlicher